Joseph James Norita Camacho (born ?) is a Northern Mariana Islands lawyer and politician.  He is a Representative in the Northern Mariana Islands House of Representatives, as of 2009, and served as the House's floor leader in the 16th Northern Marianas Legislature.

Camacho was a candidate for Lieutenant Governor of the Northern Mariana Islands as the running mate of Juan "Pan" Guerrero in the 2009 Northern Mariana Islands gubernatorial election on November 7, 2009.

Biography
Camacho was born to parents Vicente (Ben Dinga) Tudela Camacho and Marcy Lieto Norita Camacho, both of whom are now deceased.  He was raised by Torcauto Borja Tudela. Camacho's wife is Ellsbeth Viola Alepuyo. The couple have one child, Ulen Joseph Vicente Alepuyo Camacho.

Career
Camacho graduated from Marianas High School in June 1987.  He received an Associate of Arts degree in Liberal Arts from Northern Marianas College in May 1992. In December 1994, Camacho further obtained a bachelor's degree in history from San Jose State University in California.

Camacho continued his education by earning his master's degree in public administration from Seattle University, a Jesuit institution in Washington state, in December 1998. Camacho completed his Juris Doctor at the Gonzaga University School of Law, located in Spokane, Washington, in December 2001.  He worked as a pizza delivery man and a dishwasher during college.

Camacho worked as a police officer on Saipan for three years from January 1989 to August 1991.

Joseph Camacho, a Republican, was elected to the Northern Mariana Islands House of Representatives in the 2007 general election. In the 2007 election, the Covenant Party lost control of the House to the Republicans. Camacho was chosen as the floor leader of the new 16th House of Representatives. He did not seek reelection in 2009.

Candidacy for Lieutenant Governor

Democrat gubernatorial candidate Juan "Pan" Guerrero approached Camacho, a Republican, in 2009 and asked him to run on his ticket for Lieutenant Governor of the Northern Mariana Islands. Camacho accepted Guerrero's offer to run as part of the Independent ticket, which he called a "partnership." The acceptance ceremony for the gubernatorial campaign took place on March 10, 2009, at Tan Marikita Café in Garapan. Camacho explained in his speech to supporters that he had weighed all his political options before agreeing to run for Lieutenant Governor with Guerrero Camacho thanked Guerrero for the opportunity, noting that Guerrero had promised to make both the campaign and a potential administration a full "partnership."

The Guerrero/Camacho ticket only received 2,643 votes and came in a distant third in the polling.

Candidacy for United States Congress
Camacho announced in March 2010 his intentions to run for United States Congress as a candidate for the Covenant Party.

Controversy

Camacho became embroiled in local controversy after his campaign manager, Felix Nogis, was convicted and found guilty of littering in American Memorial National Park after a campaign rally.  Judge John C. Coughenour said the littering was a "disgusting display of disrespect...just as serious as if the garbage had been strewn over the graves of  military heroes."

References

Members of the Northern Mariana Islands House of Representatives
Northern Mariana Islands lawyers
Gonzaga University alumni
Seattle University alumni
San Jose State University alumni
Living people
Year of birth missing (living people)